Evgeny Shulimovich Margulis (born 25 December 1955) is a Russian rock and blues musician. He was a member of the bands Mashina Vremeni (1975-1979, 1990-2012) and Voskreseniye (1979-1980, 1994-2003) and currently performs solo. He is considered a "guru" of Moscow rock ‘n’ roll. In 1999, he was awarded the title of Meritorious Artist.

Biography
Evgeny Margulis was born in 1955 in Moscow to a middle-class Jewish family. His father was an engineer and his mother was a high school teacher.

Margulis originally planned to become a doctor, but decided to change his career plans: at the age of 19 he joined the well-known band Mashina Vremeni as a guitarist. Margulis played in the group until 1979, when he left with the drummer Sergey Kavagoe, with whom he co-founded another group Voskreseniye, where he played until 1980. In the 1980s, Margulis played in numerous groups, including Araks, Nautilus, and Yuri Antonov's band. At the end of the 1980s, he founded his first solo project, Shanghai. In 1990s, Margulis returned to the groups he previously played in - Mashina Vremeni in 1990 and Voskreseniye in 1994. From 1999 to 2003, the two groups conducted a joint concert tour called "50 for two".

On the verge of the new century, Margulis started reviving his solo projects, publishing his first disc 7+1 in 1998 and several more in the following decade. Work overload eventually led to him leaving Voskreseniye in 2003. In 2012, Margulis decided to focus completely on his solo career and left Mashina Vremeni. In 2013, he released a new album titled Margulis.

Personal life
Margulis is married to Anna Margulis, who is a ceramic artist. They have one son, Daniil, a graduate of Moscow State University (Department of Mathematics and Mechanics), currently specializing in mathematical finance. Additionally, Daniil played the role of his father in The House of the Sun, a film about underground movements in Soviet Union.

Honours
In 1999 he was awarded with Order of Honour for accomplishments in the development of musical industry by presidential decree No. 814 of 24/06/1999.

Discography

Solo

with Mashina Vremeni

with Voskreseniye 
Voskreseniye 1 (1979-1980)
Mi Vas Lubim (Live) (1995)
Jiveye Vseh Jivih (Live) (1995)
Legends of Russian Rock vol 1 (1996)
Jivaya Kolektziya (Live) (1998)
50 Na Dvoih (A concert with Mashina Vremeni) (2001)
All again (Re-recorded old songs) (2001)
Legends of Russian Rock vol 2 (2002)
Voskreseniye 79 (Remastered) (2002)
Without hurry (2003)

with Shanghai 
Shanghai (album) (1989)
Do svidaniya, drug! (1995)

with Romario and Sergey Chigrakov 
Imena (2010)

Film Music 
Potselui padshih angelov (2007)

References

External links
Official website

1955 births
Russian rock guitarists
Russian male guitarists
Russian rock singers
Russian blues guitarists
Russian blues singers
Russian Jews
Soviet male singers
Soviet Jews
Jewish musicians
Living people
Singers from Moscow
20th-century guitarists
Honored Artists of the Russian Federation
Recipients of the Order of Honour (Russia)
Russian television presenters
20th-century Russian male singers
20th-century Russian singers
20th-century Russian Jews